Neochila is a genus of beetles in the family Cicindelidae, containing the following species:

 Neochila apicenitens Cassola, 2007
 Neochila baderlei Mandl, 1981
 Neochila congoana Mandl, 1964
 Neochila glabrilabris Mandl, 1964
 Neochila grandis Mandl, 1964
 Neochila hassoni Cassola, 2007
 Neochila horii Wiesner, 1988
 Neochila katangana Mandl, 1964
 Neochila kigonserana (W. Horn, 1905)
 Neochila nitida Cassola, 2007
 Neochila prototypica (W. Horn, 1926)
 Neochila unicolorata Mandl, 1981
 Neochila upangwana Mandl, 1964

References

Cicindelidae